Monique Bégin,  (born March 1, 1936) is a Canadian academic and former politician.

Early life 

Bégin was born in Rome and raised in France and Portugal before emigrating to Canada at the end of World War II. She received a MA degree in sociology from the Université de Montréal and a PhD degree from the Sorbonne. She describes her early life in Montreal as challenging, but credits community groups and her childhood role as a Girl Guides of Canada member as "sav(ing) her life".

Political career 

In 1967, Bégin became executive secretary of the Royal Commission on the Status of Women, which published its report in 1970. She won election to the House of Commons of Canada as a Liberal candidate in the riding of Saint-Michel in Montreal in the 1972 election. Bégin, Albanie Morin and Jeanne Sauvé, all elected in 1972, were the first women ever elected to the House of Commons from Quebec.

She was appointed to the Canadian Cabinet by Prime Minister Pierre Trudeau as Minister of National Revenue from 1976 to 1977, and served as Minister of Health and Welfare from 1977 to 1979 and again from 1980 to 1984 during which she introduced the Canada Health Act in Parliament which was passed by the House of Commons and is still in force today. She declined to run again in the 1984 election and retired from politics.

Post-politics 

In 1986, she joined the University of Ottawa and Carleton University as the first joint Ottawa-Carleton Chair of Women's Studies. From 1990 to 1997, she was the University of Ottawa's dean of the Faculty of Health Sciences and continues teaching to this day as a professor emeritus. From 1993 to 1995, she also served as co-chair of Ontario's Royal Commission on Learning with Gerald Caplan.

In 1997, she was made an Officer of the Order of Canada. Bégin currently serves as the Treasurer for the International Centre for Migration and Health.

In 2015, she was a recipient of the Governor General's Award in Commemoration of the Persons Case.

In 2018, she published the memoir Ladies, Upstairs!: My Life in Politics and After.

She was elevated to a Companion of the Order of Canada in 2020.

Electoral record

Archives 

There is a Monique Bégin fonds at Library and Archives Canada.

References

External links
Citation for Governor General's Award in Commemoration of the Person's Case

1936 births
Living people
Canadian academics of women's studies
University of Paris alumni
Canadian university and college faculty deans
Women deans (academic)
Fellows of the Royal Society of Canada
Liberal Party of Canada MPs
Members of the 20th Canadian Ministry
Members of the 22nd Canadian Ministry
Members of the 23rd Canadian Ministry
Members of the House of Commons of Canada from Quebec
Companions of the Order of Canada
Members of the King's Privy Council for Canada
Women members of the House of Commons of Canada
Université de Montréal alumni
Women in Quebec politics
Canadian Ministers of Health and Welfare
Politicians from Rome
Women government ministers of Canada
20th-century Canadian women politicians
21st-century Canadian women writers
21st-century Canadian non-fiction writers
Canadian memoirists
21st-century memoirists
Politicians from Ottawa
Canadian women memoirists
Italian expatriates in France
Italian expatriates in Portugal
Italian emigrants to Canada
Governor General's Award in Commemoration of the Persons Case winners